Patricia V. Davis (born March 1956) is an American novelist and non-fiction writer. She is the editor-in-chief of the online publication Harlots’ Sauce Radio.

Biography
Patricia V. Davis is a graduate of Queens College, City University of New York. She was a student at Long Island University CW Post Campus, Brookville, New York, where she added to her existing master's degree in creative writing and education.

She married a Greek national and moved with him to Athens, Greece, where she lived for seven years before returning to the US. Their tumultuous relationship, divorce, and her eventual empowerment led to her memoir: Harlot's Sauce: a Memoir of Food, Family, Love and Loss and Greece.

When a blog post she had written went viral, her second non-fiction book was born, The Diva Doctrine: 16 Universal Principles Every Woman Needs to Know. The book covers everything from appearance, parenthood, break ups with friends, and relating to men.

Davis was invited to attend a women's conference by Maria Shriver, and the only available hotel room was on the RMS Queen Mary. Her experience aboard the ship was the inspiration for her first novel, Cooking for Ghosts; Book I of the Secret Spice Cafe Trilogy. This book is the story of four diverse women that meet online and decide to open a restaurant together aboard the historic RMS Queen Mary. It's about food, ghosts, friends, "and long-ago losses that never quite go away."

Bibliography 
 Harlot’s Sauce: A Memoir of Food, Family, Love, Loss, and Greece (2008) 
 The Diva Doctrine: 16 Universal Principles Every Woman Needs to Know (2011) 
 “Chopin, Fiendishly” (In Tales from the House Band: Volume One 2012)  
 Cooking for Ghosts: Book I in “The Secret Spice Café Trilogy (2016) 
Spells and Oregano: Book II in “The Secret Spice Café Trilogy (2017) 
Demons Well Seasoned: Book III in "The Secret Spice Cafe Trilogy (2019)

References

External links 
 Official website

Living people
American women novelists
American non-fiction writers
City University of New York alumni
LIU Post alumni
1956 births
American women non-fiction writers
21st-century American women